The canton of Trévoux is an administrative division in eastern France. At the French canton reorganisation which came into effect in March 2015, the canton was expanded from 6 to 12 communes:
 
Beauregard
Frans
Jassans-Riottier
Massieux
Misérieux
Parcieux
Reyrieux
Saint-Bernard
Saint-Didier-de-Formans
Sainte-Euphémie
Toussieux
Trévoux

Demographics

See also
Cantons of the Ain department 
Communes of France

References

Cantons of Ain